Rubus chloocladus is a European species of plants in the rose family, found in central and western Europe (Germany, Netherlands, Italy, etc.). It is a woody perennial herb sometimes as much as 2 meters (80 inches) tall. Leaves are palmately compound, each leaflet broadly egg-shaped with teeth along the edge.

References

External links
photo of herbarium specimen collected in Niedersachsen

chloocladus
Flora of Europe
Plants described in 1824